The Sandstone and Cobblestone Schools, a complex of two school buildings in Absarokee, Montana, on Main St. and at 142 S. Woodard Ave., dates from 1910 to 1921.  The complex was listed on the National Register of Historic Places in 1987.

It includes the Sandstone School, built in 1910 as a one-story two-classroom hip roofed building with rusticated coursing of stones, to serve primary students from grades one through eight in School District 52.  This was expanded in 1915 to also serve as a high school for the small number of high school students in the district, and has four  classrooms.

The students from far away boarded with families in Absarokee during the winter. During 1920 to 1940, about 50 to 70 students attended high school each year.

Dominick Rosner was architect of the 1915 addition.  W.R. Plew was architect of the 1921 work.

References

School buildings on the National Register of Historic Places in Montana
Cobblestone architecture
National Register of Historic Places in Stillwater County, Montana
School buildings completed in 1910
1910 establishments in Montana
Sandstone buildings in the United States